Sandhausen is a municipality in the district of Rhein-Neckar-Kreis, in Baden-Württemberg,  Germany.

Geography

Location
Sandhausen belongs to the Rhein-Neckar Metropolitan region. It is known for its sand dune.

History

Sandhausen is named after the ice-age sand dunes that border the municipality. As early as Roman times, a settlement called "Lochheim" existed in the area.

It was part of Bishopric of Speyer till 1262, when Otto von Bruchsal gave it to Ludwig II, Electoral Palatin. It was part of Oberamt Heidelberg in 1351. It was sacked by Baden and Württemberg troops at Mainz Diocesan Feud in 1462.

It was again sacked by Spanish troops at Thirty Years' War in 1622 and by French troops at Nine Years' War in 1688. French ones remained in Sandhausen till 1697. After dying Bavarian branch of House of Wittelsbach with death of Maximilian III, Elector of Bavaria, Charles Theodore, County Palatine of Rhine inherited Bavaria in 1777 and territories of House of Wittelsbach were united under Palatinate branch of her.

Thus, Sandhausen became part of Bavaria. It was occupied by French troops in 1795 and was awarded to Grand Duchy of Baden after German mediatization in 1803.

Politics

Municipal Council

Mayor
The mayor of Sandhausen is Hakan Günes (CDU). Previous mayors were as follows:
 1954–1981: Walter Reinhard
 1981–2005: Erich Bertsch
 2005–2021: Georg Kletti (CDU)

Sister cities 
  Lège-Cap-Ferret, France, since 1980

Economy and infrastructure

Economy
In the past, hops were grown in Sandhausen. The tobacco industry, which thrived in Sandhausen in the past, is now restricted to the rural parish of Bruchhausen.

Transportation

Schools
Sandhausen has the following schools:
 Theodor Heuss primary school
 Friedrich-Ebert-Hauptschule with Werkrealschule
 Friedrich-Ebert-Gymnasium
 Pestalozzi-Förderschule
 Music school ("Südliche Bergstraße")

Sport
The football club SV Sandhausen plays in the Hardtwaldstadion on the outskirts of the town. The club counts as the smallest professional football club in Germany playing the second division of the German league since the 2012–13 season.

Notable people
 Markus Friedrich Wendelin (born 1584 in Sandhausen), theologian and educator

References

External links
 

Rhein-Neckar-Kreis